Maria Vincent was a French film actress and singer.

Biography

Maria Vincent was born on 23 October 1929 in Marseille, Bouches-du-Rhône, France. She was married to Léo Marciano. She was known for her roles in the films Interpol Against X (1960), Secret of the Chinese Carnation (1964), and Hotel Clausewitz (1967).

Vincent died in Paris on 28 August 2006. She's the grandmother of Paola Dicelli, journalist in Elle Magazine France.

Selected filmography
 Interpol Against X (1960)
 The Secret of the Chinese Carnation (1964)
 Hotel Clausewitz (1967)

References

External links

1929 births
2001 deaths
French film actresses
Actresses from Marseille
20th-century French women singers